Cheb Bilal (Arabic: الشاب بلال. born Bilal Mouffok, موفق بلال) is an Algerian raï singer, who was born on 23 July 1966 in Cherchell, Algeria. He produces traditional music that includes instruments like congas and violins.

Career
Bilal spent much of his youth in Oran, where he studied at the conservatory of music. He was raised by his grandparents after his parents divorced at a young age.

Initially, Cheb Bilal performed at weddings and festivals around Oran. In 1980, he created the group El Ahouar. In 1989 he went to Marseille, France, which he described as a turning point in his career.

References

External links
 

1966 births
Living people
Musicians from Oran
People from Cherchell
Raï musicians
20th-century Algerian  male singers
21st-century Algerian  male singers